Nine Mile Cemetery was an ethnic Chinese cemetery located in Yangon, Myanmar.

In 1996, the Burmese government announced that the cemetery would be demolished and that remains were to be relocated to Yayway Cemetery. The interred remains from these cemetery relocation projects were reburied at Yayway Cemetery, located on the outskirts of the city. The Kyauktawgyi Buddha Temple on Mindhamma Hill was built near the site of the former cemetery.

References

Cemeteries in Myanmar
Former cemeteries